The Bergen Region is a statistical metropolitan region in the county of Hordaland in Norway. It is centered on the city of Bergen.

Old municipalities 

1/ km²2/ Population per km², population data from ssb;3/

See also 
 Bergen og omland
 Western Norway
 Metropolitan regions of Norway

References 

Metropolitan regions of Norway